Krivosúd-Bodovka  is a village and municipality in Trenčín District in the Trenčín Region of north-western Slovakia.

History
In historical records the village was first mentioned in 1398.

Geography
The municipality lies at an altitude of 200 metres and covers an area of 8.082 km². It has a population of about 303 people.

External links
http://www.krivosud-bodovka.sk/

Villages and municipalities in Trenčín District